Arnold Gerrit Henskes (6 August 1912 – 26 May 1948), known by the pseudonym Mirin Dajo, was a Dutch performer. He became famous for radically piercing his body with all kinds of objects apparently without injury, even surprising the medical community at the time.

Early life
Born in Rotterdam, Hearkens claimed to have had strange dreams and "paranormal" experiences during his youth. He would go on to start a career in the Beaux Arts, heading a design firm in his twenties. When he turned 33, he claimed to realise that his body was "invulnerable." As a result he left his job and went to Amsterdam. Later he would claim to have made money by letting people pierce his body with "dagger-like objects," as well as swallowing glass and razor blades.

Career

By this time, notorious for his radical “body piercings”, Dajo also considered an esoteric lecture a vital part of his performance. As he saw it people should abandon the materialistic world view and accept there was a higher force, "the Source". Dajo claimed that a God was using him, through his invulnerability, to show us there was something better out there. His conviction was that materialism only resulted in misery and war.

At that time he adopted his stage name Mirin Dajo, which is based on the Esperanto noun mirindaĵo meaning "wonder." He saw the use of Esperanto  – one language to be used around the world – as a way of uniting mankind. Because he needed a license to perform in public he was taken to Professor Carp, Dr. Bertholt and Dr. Stokvis of the University of Leiden. His act was allowed but not his lecture.

Although not as widely documented as his sword piercing feats, Dajo claimed that his invulnerability had been proven by numerous means. In an interview in Time magazine, he also declared his invulnerability having been tested with burning irons, boiling water, and having been shot through the head from half a yard distance on two occasions. He supported this by exhibiting two scars allegedly from the shots, one in the centre of the forehead and the other above his right eye, however, his autopsy showed no traces of any injuries to the head.

Death

In 1947, Dajo moved to Switzerland and initially was only granted a license to perform without the ability to speak to the public. In his performances Dajo used several assistants but, after many disappointments, he paired up with Jan Dirk de Groot who was his Dutch neighbour. According to De Groot, Dajo had several guardian angels, was telepathic, and could heal people. Time magazine reported on an appearance at the Coors Theatre in Zürich. The article alleged "that Dajo had 'proved' to Zurich doctors that his act was not based on faker."

On May 11th 1948, Dajo alleged that he was instructed by voices to eat a steel needle. It was surgically removed on May 13, 1948. He would need to spend much time recovering in the hospital, and to demonstrate his health he walked through Zurich directly after being released. Ten days later, when De Groot picked up his wife from the airport, Dajo lay down on a bed and went into a trance-like state. On arrival De Groot's wife was not comfortable with someone lying down as if dead, and asked De Groot to check his health. On the third day De Groot's wife asked him to check again, this time his neck felt cold. The medical examiner announced he had been dead for a day. The autopsy revealed Dajo had died of an aortic rupture.

Books
• «De onkwetsbare profeet. Het Nederlandse fenomeen Mirin Dajo» , Jan de Groot, 2003, ISBN 90-806700-6-5

• «Das Wunder Mirin Dajo» , Luc Bürgin, 2004, ISBN 3-930219-74-3

• «Das letzte geheimnis von Mirin Dajo» , Luc Bürgin, 2022, ISBN 978-3-86445-883-5

References

External links

 

Body piercers
Entertainers from Rotterdam
Dutch Esperantists
1912 births
1948 deaths